Beacon Correctional Facility was a female minimum security state prison, located in Beacon, New York, and operated by the New York State Department of Corrections and Community Supervision.  . 

Despite community opposition, Beacon Correctional Facility closed in September 2013 as a result of NYS Assembly budget cuts.  It was the state's only minimum security facility for women.

References 

Buildings and structures in Dutchess County, New York
Prisons in New York (state)
Women's prisons in New York (state)
2013 disestablishments in New York (state)